Stephen Sheppard may refer to:

 Stephen Lea Sheppard (born 1983), Canadian writer and former actor
 Stephen M. Sheppard (born 1963), law professor